The 1988 World Ninepin Bowling Classic Championships was the seventeenth edition of the championships and was held in Budapest, Hungary, from 17 to 20 May 1988.

In the men's competition the title was won by Hungary in the team competition, Boris Urbanc and Nikola Dragaš (Yugoslavia) in the pair competition and by Boris Urbanc (Yugoslavia) in the singles. In the women's competition the title was won by Yugoslavia in the team competition, Naděžda Dobešová and Daniela Žďárková (Czechoslovakia) in the pair competition and by Marianna Török (Hungary) in the singles.

Participating teams

Men

Women

Results

Men - team 
The competition was played with 200 balls (100 all, 100 clean).Teams were composed of 6 competitors and the scores were added up.

|}

Women - team 
The competition was played with 100 balls (50 all, 50 clean).Teams were composed of 6 competitors and the scores were added up.

|}

Men - pair 

|}

Women - pair 

|}

Men - single 
20 competitors with the best sum from the start team and pair advanced to the final. The results from the final were added to qualification which decided on the final event order.

Women - single 
20 competitors with the best sum from the start team and pair advanced to the final. The results from the final were added to qualification which decided on the final event order.

Medal summary

Medal table

Men

Women

References 
 WC Archive on KZS
 WC History on WNBA NBC

World Ninepin Bowling Classic Championships
1988 in bowling
1988 in Hungarian sport
International sports competitions hosted by Hungary
Sports competitions in Budapest